A dweeb is a boring, studious, or socially inept person. It may also refer to:

Dweebs (candy), a discontinued soft and chewy candy
Dweebs (TV series), a 1995 American sitcom
Dweeb, a character in the 1995 video game The Outfoxies
Dweeb, a dinosaur in the 1993 animated film We're Back! A Dinosaur's Story
Professor Dweeb, a character in the animated TV series The Real Ghostbusters